Alla Alexandrovna Kazanskaya (15 June 1920 – 25 June 2008) was a Russian stage and film actress. She began her career at the age of 18 at the Vakhtangov Theatre in Moscow. Her most notable film appearance was in the Academy Award-winning drama Burnt by the Sun (1994).

Composer Aram Khachaturian dedicated the  Waltz from his incidental music to Lermontov's Masquerade to her. By the time of her death at age 88, she was the theatre's oldest working actress. She had received the Crystal Turandot, Russia's foremost theatre award, in 2007.

Kazanskaya was the fourth wife of director Boris Barnet, who committed suicide in 1965. Their daughter Olga Barnet (1951–2021) was also an actress.

Awards
 People's Artist of the RSFSR (1971)

References

External links
 Russian-language obituary
 

1920 births
2008 deaths
Actors from Chișinău
Soviet film actresses
Soviet stage actresses
Russian film actresses
Russian stage actresses
Honored Artists of the RSFSR
People's Artists of the RSFSR
Recipients of the Order of Honour (Russia)
Burials at Novodevichy Cemetery
20th-century Russian women